Haji Muhammad is a town and union council of Gujrat District, in the Punjab province of Pakistan. It is part of Kharian Tehsil and is located at 32°38'20N 73°54'20E with an altitude of 246 metres (810 feet). Union Council Haji Muhammad has further 11 villages includes; Haji Muhammad, Gajju, Bhalot Rasoo, Bhalot Makhdoom, Bhalot Shera, Paul, Pohla, Tibbi Chand, Chokar Kalan, Spra, Dullanwala and Hera Pur.

References

Union councils of Gujrat District
Populated places in Gujrat District